The bus chassis variant of the International S series is a cowled bus chassis (conventional style) that was produced by International Harvester (later Navistar International) from 1979 to 2001.  Produced primarily for school bus applications, the chassis was also produced for other applications, including commercial-use buses and cutaway-cab buses.  In addition, the cowled chassis formed the basis for front-engine and rear-engine stripped chassis produced for bus applications.

Designed as a replacement for the International Loadstar bus chassis, the S-series bus chassis was produced in two distinct generations.  Matching the development of the International S series, during 1989, the model line underwent a major update, becoming the International 3800.   In 2004, the International 3800 ended production, replaced by the International 3300 (a cowled-chassis version of the International 4300/DuraStar).  In production for over 25 years, the S-series bus chassis was the longest-lived model line ever produced by International and the final Navistar product line developed by International Harvester.

First generation (S series; 1979–1989) 

Released during 1979 production, International Harvester introduced the S-series bus chassis alongside its conventional-cab counterpart.  Replacing the bus chassis variant of the International Harvester Loadstar, the S-series chassis continued the use of the "Schoolmaster" product name.  In a shift from being an adaptation of a truck chassis, the Schoolmaster was designed as a distinct model line intended solely for bus use.  Along with completely straight frame rails, the chassis was designed with a flat-back firewall, allowing for body mounting with minimal design adaptations.

During its production, the Schoolmaster changed relatively little.  Along with revisions to the powertrain, many changes reflected the manufacturer transition from International Harvester to Navistar International.  For 1987, the grille underwent a revision, with the "International" wording moved from the top of the grille to the bottom left, paired with Navistar's famous "Diamond Road" logo (replacing the IH logo on the steering wheel).  In another change, Navistar ended the use of gasoline-fuel engines (in all of its vehicles).

Model overview 
The Schoolmaster was produced as a variant of the International S1700 and S1800 (Class 6 trucks), with the lighter-duty S1700 and heavier-duty S1800.  Along with powertrain configurations, the two model ranges were distinguished largely by suspension weight capacities.  Following International traditional model nomenclature, the specific model numbers for the Schoolmasters ended in 3; gasoline-engine examples were given "23" model numbers while diesel-engine examples were given a "53" model number.

Powertrain
At its launch, the Schoolmaster was offered with four gasoline engines and three diesel engines (dependent on the model range specified).  The S1723 was powered solely with gasoline engines, with the International 345 V8 as standard, with three optional gasoline V8s (the 392, and the MV404 and MV446).  The S1823 was offered solely with the MV-series V8s (which ended production after 1981).  The S1853 was powered by diesel engines, with a standard 9.0L V8, along with a DT466 and Caterpillar 3208 as options (the latter, discontinued around 1982, for the Schoolmaster).

For 1983, an S1753 was introduced to introduce diesel engines to the S1700 chassis; in place of the 9.0L V8 and DT466 inline-6, International debuted a 6.9L IDI-series V8.  In 1987, the displacement of the IDI V8 was enlarged to 7.3L.  A 4-speed manual was standard on the S1700 variants, while S1800 variants were equipped with a 5-speed manual; a 4-speed automatic was optional on all engines.  Following the discontinuation of the MV-series engines, the S-1823 was phased out after 1981, while the S-1723 was phased out after 1986, after International withdrew production of gasoline engines entirely.

Second generation (3800; mid-1989–2004) 

In 1989, Navistar introduced the second generation of the S-series medium-duty trucks, renaming the Class 6 range the 4000 series.  Ending the 10-year use of the "Schoolmaster" product name, the bus chassis received a separate model designation; the S-1753 was replaced by the 3700, and the S-1853 was replaced by the 3800.  As part of the redesign, the 3700/3800 were given a redesigned hood; along with aerodynamic improvements, the design included a lower hoodline and closer-fitting fenders.  The front bumper was updated to better fit the design of the hood.  While the cowled bus chassis was produced without a cab or interior, the steering column was redesigned (adapting a two-spoke steering wheel with spokes in an inverted "V" configuration) and larger gauges for the instrument cluster were introduced.

The 3700 (equivalent to a 4700) was lower in GVWR and equipped with a 7.3L IDI V8 and hydraulic brakes; the 3800 (equivalent to a 4900) was equipped with a DTA360 I6 and air brakes.

Model history 

Over its 15 years of production, the second generation of the S-series chassis underwent few changes, centered around revisions to its powertrain.  For 1991, the 3600 chassis variant was developed for the Thomas Vista semi-forward control conventional.  The lower-GVWR 3700 was discontinued after 1994.

After 1994, the lower-GVWR 3700 was discontinued.  For 1995, along with all other International medium-duty trucks, the 3800 received chrome hood badges denoting the model series and its engine type; the grille badging changed from red to chrome.

A key event that would affect school bus manufacturing during the later 1990s was the completion of the acquisition of AmTran by Navistar in April 1995.  By the end of the decade, AmTran buses would begin to start wearing International badging on the body as well.  To promote the change, in 2002, International redesigned the hood for its conventional bus, dubbed the International IC.  These wore vertical grille slats instead of horizontal ones seen since 1989 (although the horizontal grille slats continued to be produced for the 3800 until 2004).  As it was a change intended to promote IC Corporation, chassis destined for Blue Bird or Canadian manufacturer Corbeil were still received with the standard hood and grille design.

Variants

3400

Using the low-profile International 4700LP as a basis, the 3400 has been among the largest vehicles developed as cutaway cab chassis.  While far larger than a van chassis, International marketed its design by allowing the higher GVWR and higher durability associated with a medium-duty chassis.  All versions of the 3400 were powered by the 7.3L IDI and T444E V8 engines and used hydraulic brakes.

Primarily used by manufacturers of transit minibuses and specialty vehicles, during the mid to late 1990s, several school bus body manufacturers (Mid Bus and U.S. Bus) developed body designs for the International 3400.

After 2001, International ended production of the 4000-series; the 3400 was replaced by the 3200 based upon the new-generation 4000-series trucks (later the DuraStar, today the MV).  While International (under its IC Bus brand) produces cutaway-cab chassis, all production is for commercial use, including transit, commercial, and specialty vehicle applications.

3600

Introduced in 1991, the 3600 was a chassis custom-designed for manufacturer Thomas Built Buses for its Thomas Vista product line.  Designated a semi-forward control design, the Vista combined design elements of conventional and forward control school buses.

The 3600 chassis borrowed elements and its overall configuration from Navistar step van chassis, adapting other components from the 3800.  In comparison to the 3800, the driver of the Vista sat further forward (shifted nearly atop the front axle instead of behind it).  In line with a transit-style bus, the driver sat next to much of the engine; access from the front was also maintained via a tilting hood (shortened in length by nearly half).  Both the 7.3L/T444E V8s and the DT inline-6 engines were offered.

As the 3600 chassis was developed alongside the 1991 update for the Thomas Vista body, it was never used on another product line.  Following the purchase of Thomas Built Buses by Freightliner, the Thomas Vista was discontinued after 1998 production; elements of its design were adopted into the Thomas Saf-T-Liner C2.

3700

From 1989 to 1994, International offered two versions of its conventional school bus chassis (as it had with the S series).  The 3700 was the lighter-GVWR model of the lineup, derived from the International 4600.  Only produced with the 7.3L IDI V8 engine, the 3700 was offered with hydraulic brakes.

For 1995, International consolidated the two model lines, discontinuing the 3700.

Powertrain 
Following the retirement of gasoline engines in 1986, the second-generation S-series became the first American school bus chassis powered entirely with diesel engines.  In place of both its predecessor (and successor), all engines were sourced from International.  The 3700 offered the 7.3L IDI as a standard engine, with a DTA360 as a standard engine for the 3800; a DT466 was offered as an option on the latter.

Along with 5 and 6-speed manual transmissions, multiple automatic transmissions were paired with the T444E and DT466 engines.

Stripped chassis (1981–2024) 
Along with its conventional-style cowled chassis, International has produced stripped-chassis variants for transit-style school buses in both front and rear-engine configurations.

Forward control (1981–2010) 
Replacing the Loadstar 1853FC, the front-engine International 1853FC (FC=Forward Control) was produced from 1981 to 1989.  While produced as a bare chassis, the model line shared the steering column and instrument cluster from the S-series conventionals. Unlike the S-series conventional, the chassis was powered exclusively by a diesel engine; the 9.0L V8 was the standard engine, with the DT466 I6 offered as an option.

In 1990, the 1853FC was replaced by the more advanced 3900.  In a major revision of the frame, the 3900 significantly reduced the interior space required for the engine compartment (freeing up space for the driver and front stairwell), using narrower DT-series inline-6 engines exclusively.  Utilized by several body manufacturers (though primarily Ward/AmTran and its IC successor), the 3900 was produced until 2010.

Rear-engine (1996–2024) 
In 1996, International entered rear-engine chassis production (for the first time since the early 1970s), developing the International 3000 chassis for the AmTran RE.  Sharing powertrain and chassis components with the 3800, the 3000 was designed for both V8 and inline-6 engines from multiple manufacturers.

As of 2020 production, the International 3000 rear-engine chassis is the final variant of the S-series that remains in production (24 years after its release).

Body manufacturers 

Over its 25-year production, the S-series was bodied by many bus manufacturers, primarily for use as a school bus.  The first generation chassis saw use by many manufacturers across North America, as did the 3800 during most of the 1990s.

Following the 1995 acquisition of AmTran by Navistar,  school bus production began a transition, as chassis suppliers and body manufacturers began a period of joint ventures and acquisitions.  During the late 1990s, the market share of International grew as several body manufacturers (Wayne and Carpenter) closed down; while Freightliner began chassis production in 1997, Ford and General Motors were gradually phased out of full-size chassis production.

At the time the 3800 ended production in 2004, the number of full-size body manufacturers from 1979 had decreased from eight to three (Blue Bird, Thomas, and IC, the successor to AmTran/Ward); International was the sole remaining chassis manufacturer (following the exit of Ford and GM, Freightliner and Blue Bird commenced production of cowled chassis).

See also 
 International Harvester – manufacturer (S series)
 Navistar International – manufacturer (3800)
 Chevrolet/GMC B-Series – competing bus chassis
 Ford B-Series – competing bus chassis
 School Bus
 List of buses

References

External links 
 
 

S series
Navistar International buses
School bus chassis
Vehicles introduced in 1979